Kōnosuke, Konosuke, Kounosuke or Kohnosuke (written: 鋼之介, 耿之介 or 幸之助) is a masculine Japanese given name. Notable people with the name include:

, pen-name of Higuchi Kunito, Japanese poet
, Japanese photographer
, Japanese businessman
, Japanese long-distance runner
, Japanese professional wrestler
, Japanese anime director

Japanese masculine given names